London Symphony Orchestra is an album series by Frank Zappa, released in two parts as London Symphony Orchestra, Vol. I in 1983 and London Symphony Orchestra, Vol. II, in 1987. They were recorded at the same sessions, in January 1983. The two albums were later combined, and re-released on a Rykodisc CD as London Symphony Orchestra Vol. I & II (1995).

Background
Volume I features the London Symphony Orchestra performing four instrumental compositions — "Sad Jane", "Pedro's Dowry", "Envelopes", and "Mo 'n Herb's Vacation" — from sessions recorded in January 1983. The album was Zappa's fourth to employ an orchestra, following Lumpy Gravy (1967), 200 Motels (1971) and Orchestral Favorites (1979).

The album was recorded using a digital 24-track recorder. It was one of the earliest digital multitrack recordings of an orchestra. By recording the orchestra with many microphones very close to the instruments the album sounds more detailed than possible with previous stereo recording techniques. Extensive use of editing was employed to fix musical mistakes.

The original vinyl LP recordings were tweaked in the studio to hide out-of-tune and wrong notes as well as to add in a sheen of reverb to further obscure parts. These audio "enhancements" were removed when the recordings were remixed for the compact disc re-issue in 1995. This version of the album was combined with London Symphony Orchestra, Vol. II (1987), and re-released on a Rykodisc CD as London Symphony Orchestra Vol. I & II.

Track listings

Volume One
All tracks written, composed and arranged by Frank Zappa.

Volume Two

CD

Personnel

Musicians
The London Symphony Orchestra conducted by Kent Nagano
David Ocker – clarinet
Chad Wackerman – drums
Ed Mann – percussion

Production staff
Frank Zappa – producer
Mark Pinske – recording engineer
John Vince – cover design
James Stagnita – graphic design (Vol II)
Mark Hanauer – cover photo (Vol II)

References

External links
Album details
Release information

1983 albums
Albums produced by Frank Zappa
Barking Pumpkin Records albums
Frank Zappa albums
London Symphony Orchestra albums